Sarah Borges is a rock and roll musician based in the Boston, Massachusetts, area, formerly signed to Sugar Hill Records.  Her music has been described as "walking that fine line between punk and country".  Borges' wide variety of influences are often noted.  They range from Dolly Parton, Mahalia Jackson, X, Sid Vicious, Merle Haggard, to bubblegum pop.

Borges grew up in Taunton, Massachusetts, a city south of Boston, in the third generation of a Portuguese (hence the hard "g" in her name) family.  She was interested in musical theatre as a youth and majored in the subject while a student at Emerson College. Borges was married to Boston-area guitar player Lyle Brewer. Circa 2010-2013, Borges gave birth to a son.

Borges has long called her band The Broken Singles, with the only other constant member being Binky, the bassist and her longtime friend.  Over the years, various different lead guitarists and drummers have performed with the band.

On the strength of a performance at the South by Southwest Festival in 2004, Borges earned a record deal with Houston's Blue Corn Records.  Her first record, 2005's Silver City earned praise for showcasing "an unusual knack for mixing alternative rock with country".  Allmusic compared Borges to Maria McKee of Lone Justice, and admired how her songs "balance some fierce guitar licks with heartfelt twang".

After much national touring and opening for noted acts such as Dave Alvin, Sarah Borges and The Broken Singles 
were signed by Sugar Hill Records.  The title of her 2007 release Diamonds in the Dark  is a line from the song Come Back to Me, by one of her favorite bands, X.  The album features a cover of this song, many original works, and Tom Waits and Greg Cartwright covers.  Allmusic commended the album as "grittily brilliant" with songs that are "brilliantly rollicking".

A third album, The Stars Are Out was released in March 2009.  Borges commented that the album features more of a straightforward rock n roll sound
than her earlier work. The album features five covers of artists ranging from Smokey Robinson to The Lemonheads.  Allmusic describes the album as "material grounded in Americana even as it morphs from folk to rock and even soul" and calls it a "short but sweet collection". After its release, Borges and the Broken Singles received a nomination for Best Emerging Artist at the Americana Music Association festival in Nashville.

Borges released Radio Sweetheart in 2014 on Lonesome Day Records, which was recorded at Napoleon Complex in Somerville, Massachusetts, and Woolly Mammoth Sound in Waltham, Massachusetts. Borges released a follow up EP in 2016, Good & Dirty, which was produced by Eric "Roscoe" Ambel.

Sarah Borges and the Broken Singles released Love's Middle Name in 2018. They continue to tour into 2021.

Discography

References

External links
 
 Sarah Borges collection at the Internet Archive's live music archive

American alternative country singers
American women country singers
American country singer-songwriters
People from Taunton, Massachusetts
Emerson College alumni
Living people
Year of birth missing (living people)
Singer-songwriters from Massachusetts
21st-century American women
Country musicians from Massachusetts